The 2002–03 Illinois Fighting Illini men's basketball team represented University of Illinois at Urbana-Champaign in the 2002-03 NCAA Division I men's basketball season.  This was head coach Bill Self's third (and final) season at Illinois.

Season
The 2003 squad started three freshmen, a sophomore and one senior, and still finished with a 25-7 record and second-place finish in the Big Ten. Brian Cook earned Big Ten Player of the Year honors and the Illini won the Big Ten tournament championship for the first time.

Roster

Schedule
												
Source																
												

|-
!colspan=12 style="background:#DF4E38; color:white;"| Non-Conference regular season

|-
!colspan=9 style="background:#DF4E38; color:#FFFFFF;"|Big Ten regular season

|-
!colspan=9 style="text-align: center; background:#DF4E38"|Big Ten tournament

|-			
!colspan=9 style="text-align: center; background:#DF4E38"|NCAA tournament

|-

Season Statistics

NCAA basketball tournament
West regional
 Illinois 65, Western Kentucky 60
 Notre Dame 68, Illinois 60

Awards and honors
 Brian Cook
Big Ten tournament Most Outstanding Player
Big Ten Player of the Year
Chicago Tribune Silver Basketball award
Team Most Valuable Player 
Fighting Illini All-Century team (2005)
Sporting News 2nd team All-American
Associated Press 3rd team All-American
National Association of Basketball Coaches 3rd team All-American
Basketball Times 3rd team All-American

Team players drafted into the NBA

Rankings

References

Illinois Fighting Illini
Illinois
Illinois Fighting Illini men's basketball seasons
2002 in sports in Illinois
2003 in sports in Illinois
Big Ten men's basketball tournament championship seasons